P. alpinum may refer to:
 Papaver alpinum, the Alpine poppy, a plant species found in the Alps
 Parthenium alpinum, the Alpine feverfew and Wyoming feverfew, a flowering plant species native to Wyoming, Colorado, and New Mexico in the United States
 Phleum alpinum, the Alpine timothy or Mountain timothy, a grass species with a circumboreal distribution